The 2005–06 KCC Professional Basketball season was the tenth season of the Korean Basketball League.

Regular season

Playoffs

Prize money
Seoul Samsung Thunders: KRW 150,000,000 (champions + regular-season 2nd place)
Ulsan Mobis Phoebus: KRW 150,000,000 (runners-up + regular-season 1st place)
Wonju Dongbu Promy: KRW 30,000,000 (regular-season 3rd place)

External links
Official KBL website (Korean & English)

2005–06
2005–06 in South Korean basketball
2005–06 in Asian basketball leagues